is a sub-kilometer asteroid, classified as near-Earth object and potentially hazardous asteroid of the Apollo group. It will be a quasi-satellite of Earth until around 2600.

On 14 April 2004 (with less than a 1-day observation arc), the Sentry Risk Table showed 180 virtual impactors. It was removed from the Sentry Risk Table 2 days later on 16 April 2004.  now has a well determined orbit with an observation arc of 12 years.

See also

References

External links 
 Dynamical evolution of Earth’s quasi-satellites: 2004 GU9 and 2006 FV35 by Wajer, P. 2010, Icarus, Volume 209, Issue 2, pp. 488–493.
 
 
 

164207
164207
164207
164207
164207
164207
20040413